Samir Sahiti (born 15 August 1988) is an Albanian professional footballer who plays for KF Bylis Ballsh in the Albanian Superliga.

References

External links
 
 Profile - FSHF

1988 births
Living people
Sportspeople from Mitrovica, Kosovo
Association football midfielders
Association football defenders
Kosovan footballers
KF Trepça'89 players
KF Trepça players
KF Hysi players
FK Renova players
KF Drenica players
KF Ferizaj players
KF Skënderbeu Korçë players
KF Bylis Ballsh players
KF Vëllaznimi players
KF Flamurtari players
Football Superleague of Kosovo players
Macedonian First Football League players
Kategoria Superiore players
Kosovan expatriate footballers
Expatriate footballers in North Macedonia
Kosovan expatriate sportspeople in North Macedonia
Expatriate footballers in Albania
Kosovan expatriate sportspeople in Albania